Pay Takht-e Varzard (also Romanized as Pāy Takht-e Varzard; also known as Varzard Pāytakht) is a village in Margha Rural District, in the Central District of Izeh County, Khuzestan Province, Iran. At the 2006 census, its population was 164, in 31 families.

References 

Populated places in Izeh County